Chris Spencer (born January 2, 1968) is an American actor, comedian, writer, and producer.

Career
Spencer was the first host of the syndicated late-night talk show Vibe, based on the magazine of the same name. He has gone on to star in several film projects such as Don't Be A Menace To South Central While Drinking Your Juice In The Hood, The Sixth Man, Significant Others, and Postal. Chris is also one of the most sought after writers having done projects with Wayans family, Jamie Foxx, and was significant in helping Nick Cannon create MTV's Wild 'N Out. Chris Spencer also travels the country as a standup comedian and has performed on The Chris Rock Show, Jimmy Kimmel Live! and HBO's Def Comedy Jam. Chris and fellow friends, Al Madrigal and Maz Jobrani are on a weekly podcast, Minivan Men. He is a writer for the scripted comedy, Real Husbands of Hollywood. In 2017, he co-created a TV series White Famous.

Personal life
Spencer, a Jamaican American, was born in Los Angeles on January 2, 1968. He currently lives in Los Angeles with his wife, Vanessa Spencer, and their two children.

Spencer is a UCLA alum.

Filmography

Film

Television

Writer
 2005 Wild 'N Out
 2002 Jamie Foxx: I Might Need Security
 2014 The Youngs

Producer
 2005 Baggin'''
 2001 Get Up Stand Up Comedy''

External links

Biography and booking agent

1968 births
Living people
African-American male actors
American male film actors
Film producers from California
American actors of Jamaican descent
Male actors from Los Angeles
Late night television talk show hosts
21st-century African-American people
20th-century African-American people